The Supercopa 2006 was disputed in Málaga. The teams that took part in the tournament are:

Unicaja - Liga ACB champion
TAU Ceramica - Copa del Rey champion
Winterthur FCB - 3rd in Liga ACB
DKV Joventut - 4th in Liga ACB

Semifinals
September 22, 2006:

 TAU Cerámica 76 - 52  Winterthur FCB : (Official Match Recap)

 Unicaja 74 - 66  DKV Joventut: (Official Match Recap)

Final
September 23, 2006:

Unicaja 78 - 83  TAU Cerámica : (Official Match Recap), (Recap)

MVP: Tiago Splitter of TAU Cerámica

See also
 Supercopa de España de Baloncesto
 ACB

External links
 Official website

Supercopa de España de Baloncesto
2006–07 in Spanish basketball cups